Umed Singh (5 October 1936 – 29 September 2006) was a politician from Rajasthan state, India.

Singh was elected for a first five-year term as Member of the Legislative Assembly (MLA) from Barmer district, Rajasthan, in 1962, on an Independent ticket. In 1980, he was elected for a second five-year term as MLA from Deedwana constituency on a Janata Party ticket. In 1985, he was elected for a third five-year term as MLA from Sheo constituency on a Janata Party ticket.

References

Rajasthani people
1936 births
2006 deaths
Janata Party politicians
Bharatiya Janata Party politicians from Rajasthan
People from Barmer, Rajasthan
Rajasthan MLAs 1980–1985
Rajasthan MLAs 1962–1967
Rajasthan MLAs 1985–1990